Tyler Jordon Blackburn (born October 12, 1986) is an American actor, singer and model. He is best known for playing Caleb Rivers on the hit Freeform series Pretty Little Liars and its spin-off, Ravenswood. He most recently starred as Alex Manes in The CW series Roswell, New Mexico (2019–2022).

Early life
Blackburn was born in Burbank, California. He has one older sister and three younger brothers.

Blackburn has a 4 inch long scar on his left shoulder. This was caused due to the removal of a benign bone tumor at the age of 10.

Career

Acting
Blackburn began performing in 2004 and appeared on the series Unfabulous on Nickelodeon. In the following year he was a teacher in the short film The Doers of Coming Deeds. In 2008, he made a cameo in the film Next of Kin. In 2009, Blackburn appeared in Cold Case and Rockville CA, a webseries launched by Josh Schwartz. In 2010, he appeared on Days of Our Lives, Gigantic, and was also in the independent film Peach Plum Pear.

In October 2010, Blackburn was cast in a recurring role as Caleb Rivers in the television series Pretty Little Liars. He was upgraded to series regular for the third season starting in the summer of 2012.

Blackburn also starred as Pete in the six-episode web series Wendy, a project developed by Alloy Entertainment and Macy's that was based on Peter Pan which premiered on September 15, 2011. In 2012, he starred in drama Hiding alongside Ana Villafañe, Jeremy Sumpter, Dean Armstrong and Dan Payne.

In May 2013, it was announced that Blackburn would star in the 2013 Pretty Little Liars spin-off Ravenswood.

In March 2018, Blackburn joined the cast of The CW series Roswell, New Mexico.

Music
For his role in Alloy Entertainment web series Wendy, Blackburn recorded Golden State's "Save Me" to be used as the show's theme song, which was released on August 15, 2011. He recorded "Find a Way" in 2012 for the ABC Family television show, The Secret Life of the American Teenager, and the song played while he was starring on Pretty Little Liars.  He has recorded several songs with Novi, including "Can't Love Me" which played in the twelfth episode of Roswell, New Mexico.

Personal life
Blackburn publicly came out as bisexual on April 19, 2019 through an interview with The Advocate. Also in 2019, Blackburn revealed that he and his co-star on Pretty Little Liars, Ashley Benson, briefly dated, but they remained “good friends” after they broke up.

Filmography

Film

Television

Web

Discography

Extended play

Singles

As main artist

As featured artist

Promotional singles

Music videos

Awards and nominations

References

External links

 
 

1986 births
Living people
American male film actors
American male television actors
Bisexual musicians
Male actors from Burbank, California
21st-century American male actors
Male models from California
Bisexual male actors
LGBT models
American LGBT singers
LGBT people from California
21st-century American male singers
21st-century American singers
21st-century American LGBT people
American bisexual actors